Chambray is a commune in the Eure department of northern France, 13 km northeast of Évreux on the north bank of the river Eure.

The Château de Chambray, in the north of the commune, is the ancestral home of the Marquis de Venevelles d'Espagne.

Population

See also
Communes of the Eure department

References

Communes of Eure